Bretteville-sur-Ay is a commune in the Manche department in Normandy in northwestern France.

Population

International relations
Bretteville is twinned with the village of Sway, England.

See also
Communes of the Manche department

References

Communes of Manche